is a Japanese voice actress. She is a former member of 81 Produce and Pro-Fit, and a member of Office Osawa.

Filmography

Anime series

OVA/ONA

Video games
Granblue Fantasy as Almeida, Shion
Food Wars! Shokugeki no Soma: The Dish of Friendship and Bonds as Ikumi Mito
Seven Pirates Parute Kairi
Azur Lane as Cheshire, Little Cheshire, Hiryuu, & Hiryuu META
Fire Emblem Heroes as Petra, Echidna
Shadowverse as Erika Sumeragi
 Under Night In-Birth as Erika Wagner Miyashiro
 Yuki Yuna is a Hero: A Sparkling Flower as Shizuku Yamabushi
 Magia Record: Puella Magi Madoka Magica Side Story as Masara Kagami
Tayutama 2 -you're the only one- as Hifumi Saijo
Is It Wrong to Try to Pick Up Girls in a Dungeon? Infinite Combate as Syr Flover
Action Taimanin as Faust
Arknights as Ch'en
Fire Emblem: Three Houses as Petra Macneary
Counter:Side as Lyudmila
Blue Archive as Saori Joumae

Dubbing roles

Live-action
 The Time Traveler's Wife (Young Clare Abshire (Everleigh McDonell))

Animation
 PAW Patrol (Chase)
 PAW Patrol: The Movie (Chase)
 The Epic Tales of Captain Underpants (Harold Hutchins)

Discography

References

External links
 Official agency profile 
 

1988 births
Living people
Japanese video game actresses
Japanese voice actresses
Voice actresses from Tokyo